Visi  may refer to:
 Carla Visi (born 1970), a popular Brazilian axé and MPB singer, songwriter,  occasional actress and television show host
 Michel Visi (1954-2007), the bishop of the Roman Catholic Diocese of Port-Vila, Vanuatu 
 an abbreviation for Our Lady of the Visitation School in Cincinnati, Ohio
 Volt Information Sciences' ticker symbol (VISI)

See also
 Visi-Flash, the trade name used by R. E. Dietz Company for their line of battery powered transistorized barricade warning lights
 Visi On, a short-lived but influential graphical user interface-based operating environment program by VisiCorp's for IBM PC compatible personal computers running early versions of MS-DOS
 The Vesi, a Roman-era barbarian people who were apparent ancestors to the Visigoths